Karadiken is a village in Tarsus district of Mersin Province, Turkey. At  it is situated in the southern slopes of Toros Mountains. The population of the village was 603  as of 2012. It is a typical Çukurova village. Cotton, grapes and fresh vegetables being the main crops.

References

Villages in Tarsus District